Tie Your Mix Down: A Queen Tribute is a Queen tribute album. It features various covers of Queen songs by various artists.  Despite the album's name, these songs are not remixes of original Queen material, but are cover versions performed by the artists themselves.  The covers are very techno and electronica influenced, and because of this the album is unpopular among the band's fans.

Track listing 
 Tie Your Mother Down (Die Krupps Remix) - 3:43 - May
 Sheer Heart Attack (Chemical Whore Remix) - 3:42 - Mercury
 Another One Bites the Dust (Meeks Remix) - 3:47 - Deacon
 Keep Yourself Alive (Sigue Sigue Sputnik Remix) - 4:41 - May
 Save Me (Interface Remix) - 4:11 - May
 Get Down, Make Love (Die Krupps Remix) - 3:52 - Mercury
 We are the Champions (Rosetta Stone Remix) - 4:01 - Mercury
 I Want It All (Julian Beeston Remix) - 4:50 - May
 We Will Rock You (KMFDM Remix) - 4:58 - May
 It's Late (Sheep on Drugs Remix) - 4:02 - May
 One Vision (Spahn Ranch Remix) - 4:22 - Queen
 Killer Queen (System Effect Remix) - 3:51 - Mercury

References 

Queen (band) tribute albums
2000 compilation albums
Cleopatra Records compilation albums